Pastinaca (parsnips) is a genus of flowering plant in the family Apiaceae, comprising 14 species. Economically, the most important member of the genus is Pastinaca sativa, the parsnip.

Etymology
The etymology of the generic name Pastinaca is not known with certainty. The name may be derived from the Latin word pastino (or pastinare), meaning "to prepare the ground for planting of the vine" (or more simply, "to dig") or the Latin word pastus, meaning "food", liberally translated as "Earth-food".

Taxonomy
, Plants of the World Online accepted 15 species:
Pastinaca argyrophylla Delip.
Pastinaca armena Fisch. & C.A.Mey.
Pastinaca aurantiaca (Albov) Kolak.
Pastinaca clausii (Ledeb.) Calest.
Pastinaca erzincanensis Menemen & Kandemir
Pastinaca gelendostensis (Yıld. & B.Selvi) Hand
Pastinaca glandulosa Boiss. & Hausskn.
Pastinaca hirsuta Pančić
Pastinaca kochii Duby
Pastinaca lucida L.
Pastinaca pimpinellifolia M.Bieb.
Pastinaca sativa L. – parsnip
Pastinaca trysia Stapf & Wettst.
Pastinaca yildizii Dirmenci
Pastinaca zozimoides Fenzl

References

External links
 

Apioideae
Apioideae genera